S. A. Bodeen (or Stephanie Stuve-Bodeen) is an American children's and young adult book author. She is best known for her young adult science fiction novels The Compound and The Gardener, and books for children and adults like A Small Brown Dog with a Wet Pink Nose and for her picture books about Elizabeti, a young Tanzanian girl. The first book in the series, Elizabeti's Doll, won the 1999 Ezra Jack Keats New Writer Award from the New York Public Library, and was named a Charlotte Zolotow Award Highly Commended Title.

Bibliography

As Stephanie Stuve-Bodeen

Elizabeti’s Doll, Lee & Low Books, 1998
We’ll Paint the Octopus Red, Woodbine House, 1998
Mama Elizabeti, Lee & Low Books, 2000
Elizabeti’s School, Lee & Low Books, 2002
Babu’s Song, Lee & Low Books, 2003
The Best Worst Brothers, Woodbine House, 2005
A Small Brown Dog with a Wet Pink Nose, Little, Brown Books for Young Readers, 2009

As S. A. Bodeen
 The Compound, Feiwel and Friends, 2008
 The Gardener, Square Fish, 2011
 The Raft, Feiwel and Friends/Macmillan, 2012
 The Fallout, Feiwel and Friends, 2013
 Shipwreck Island, Feiwel and Friends, 2014
 Lost, Feiwel and Friends, 2015
 The Detour, Feiwel and Friends, 2015
 Trapped, Feiwel and Friends, 2016
 Found, Feiwel and Friends, 2017
 The Tomb, Feiwel and Friends, 2018

References

External links
 
 Publisher's Author Page*

Living people
20th-century American novelists
20th-century American women writers
21st-century American novelists
21st-century American women writers
American children's writers
American science fiction writers
American women children's writers
American women novelists
Women science fiction and fantasy writers
Year of birth missing (living people)